Arnold Blanch (June 4, 1896 – October 3, 1968), was born and raised in Mantorville, Minnesota. He was an American modernist painter, etcher, illustrator, lithographer, muralist, printmaker and art teacher.

Life

His modernist paintings are associated with the Social Realist movement. Blanch met his first wife the painter Lucile Blanch, (born Lucile Lundquist), at the Minneapolis School of Art.

After the end of World War I, Lucile and Arnold Blanch moved to New York City and enrolled at the Art Students League of New York, studying with John Sloan, Robert Henri, Kenneth Hayes Miller and Boardman Robinson. Eventually by 1923 they settled in Woodstock, New York, which was then beginning to become an important art colony for young artists. By the 1920s Blanch began to achieve recognition for his paintings and lithographs of landscapes and still lifes. During the 1930s in New York, Blanch worked for the Section of Painting and Sculpture on various mural projects, including The Harvest at the United States Post Office in Fredonia, New York.

In 1939, Blanch remarried and for many years he lived in Woodstock, New York with his second wife Doris Lee, also an artist. Blanch taught at the Art Students League's branch in Woodstock for several decades from the 1930s until his death in the late 1960s. His paintings are in the permanent collections of the Metropolitan Museum of Art; the Museum of Modern Art in New York City; the Cleveland Museum of Art; the Whitney Museum of American Art; the Smith College Museum of Art; the Sheldon Museum of Art; the Woodstock Artists Association and Museum (WAAM); one of the oldest American artists' organizations, and dozens of others.

Among Blanch's pupils was the painter and printmaker Bertha Landers.

Solo exhibitions 
 Dudensing Galleries, New York City, 1928
 Dudensing Galleries, New York City, 1930
 Walden-Dudensing Gallery, Chicago, 1930
 Ulrich Gallery, Minneapolis, 1930
 Beaux Arts Gallery, San Francisco, 1930
 Rehn Galleries, New York City, 1932
 Rehn Galleries, New York City, 1935
 Associated American Artists, New York City, 1940
 Associated American Artists, New York City, 1945 
 Krasner Gallery, New York City, 1960's
 Rudolph Galleries, Woodstock, NY and Coral Gables, Fla., 1950s & 1960s

Awards and honors 
 Scholarship, Art Students League, New York City, 1916
 Norman Waite Harris Silver Medal, Art Institute of Chicago, Chicago, Illinois, 1929
 Anne Bremer First Prize, Art Association Purchase Prize, San Francisco Art Association, San Francisco, California, 1931
 Fellowship, John Simon Guggenheim Memorial Foundation, 1933
 Beck Gold Medal, Pennsylvania Academy of the Fine Arts, Philadelphia, Pennsylvania, 1938
 Third Prize, Annual Carnegie International Exhibition of Paintings, Carnegie Institute, Pittsburgh, Pennsylvania
 Prize, Domesday Press Competition in Juvenile Book Illustration, New York City, 1945
 First Prize and two Honorable Mentions for designs, National Ceramic Exhibition, Syracuse Museum of Fine Arts, Syracuse, New York, 1949
 First Prize at the National Ceramic Exhibition, 1949 and 1951
 Purchase Prize, Art USA, New York, 1959
 Purchase Prize, Mary Washington College of the University of Virginia, 1959
 Best Painting in Show, Albany Art Institute, 1960
 Prize, Landscape Painting, Silvermine Guild of Artists, 1961
 Ford Grant, 1964

References

External links

Archives of American Art 1963 Arnold Blanch interview
Archives of American Art 1964 Arnold Blanch interview
Smithsonian Archives
Askart
Artnet

1896 births
1968 deaths
People from Mantorville, Minnesota
Students of Robert Henri
20th-century American painters
American male painters
Modern painters
American muralists
American illustrators
Art Students League of New York faculty
Art Students League of New York alumni
Artists from Minnesota
People from Woodstock, New York
Section of Painting and Sculpture artists
20th-century American printmakers
20th-century American male artists